Lookism is the discriminatory treatment of people who are considered physically unattractive. It occurs in a variety of settings, including dating, social environments, and workplaces. Lookism has received less cultural attention than other forms of discrimination (such as racism and sexism) and typically does not have the legal protections that other forms often have, but it is still widespread and significantly affects people's opportunities in terms of romantic relationships, job opportunities, and other realms of life. The same concept from the opposite angle is sometimes named pretty privilege.

Physical attractiveness is associated with positive qualities; in contrast, physical unattractiveness is associated with negative qualities. Many people make judgments of others based on their physical appearance which influence how they respond to these people. Research on the "what is beautiful is good" stereotype shows that, overall, those who are physically attractive benefit from their good looks: physically attractive individuals are perceived more positively and physical attractiveness has a strong influence on judgement of a person's competence. Furthermore, research shows that on average, attractive individuals have more friends, better social skills, and more active sex lives.

Lexicology
Though the term "lookism" is of recent coinage, cultures and traditions worldwide have often warned against placing undue value on physical appearance:

To judge by appearances is to get entangled in the Veil of Maya [in Buddhist thought] ... From ancient times until relatively recently, there was widespread worry about lookism, because the appearance of others may deceive, especially in romance, or it may be personally or politically imprudent to judge or act on appearances. Judging by appearances was prohibited by monotheistic religions ("no graven images") and criticized in ancient and medieval philosophies. Skeptics, Stoics, Cynics, Epicureans and Scholastics elaborated various reasons to avoid or subordinate the role of appearances.

The term "lookism" grew in popularity in the 1970s within the fat acceptance movement. It was used in The Washington Post Magazine in 1978, which asserted that the term was coined by fat people who created the word to refer to "discrimination based on looks." The word appears in several major English language dictionaries. There is some overlap between the terms fatphobia, teratophobia, cacophobia and lookism.

In the 1990, the term "lookism" was used by Smith College to warn incoming students of "lookism, a form of oppression, that involves putting too much stock in personal appearance."

Studies
Lookism has received scholarly attention both from a cultural studies and an economics perspective. In the former context, lookism relates to preconceived notions of beauty and cultural stereotyping based on appearance as well as gender roles and expectations. Important economic considerations include the question of income gaps based on looks, as well as increased or decreased productivity from workers considered beautiful or ugly by their co-workers. Due to this, new problems arise that are tied to other social issues like racism and ageism (young over old). The idea of beauty is also linked directly to social class because people who have more free time and money have the ability to work on their appearance. Weight is also linked to social class because people who are overweight do not have the exercise equipment or the healthy food choices that wealthier people do. Judging people on the basis of attractiveness decreases a person's self-esteem leading to a negative self-image.

Some writers have examined this phenomenon among gay men. According to the block quote on page 117 of a 2004 work by Todd Morrison, author Michelangelo Signorile (in a 1997 overview of contemporary trends in the gay male community) described "body fascism" asthe setting of a rigid set of standards of physical beauty that pressures everyone within a particular group to conform to them. Any person who doesn't meet those very specific standards is deemed physically unattractive and sexually undesirable. In a culture in which the physical body is held in such high esteem and given such power, body fascism then not only deems those who don't or can't conform to be sexually less desirable, but in the extreme – sometimes dubbed "looksism" – also deems an individual completely worthless as a person, based solely on his exterior. In this sense it is not unlike racism or sexism or homophobia itself. ... (p. 28)In an October 2020 a paper from University of Memphis examined the effects of instructors' attractiveness on student evaluations of their teaching.

A 2021 study on the effects of the wearing of facemasks in the hospitality industry corroborated existing findings on the correlation between perceived physical attractiveness of frontline workers and customer satisfaction. The study found that the wearing of facemasks by hospitality employees minimized the effects of their actual attractiveness on reported customer satisfaction, leveling off the playing field between average-looking employees and attractive-looking employees.

Empirical support
According to Nancy Etcoff, a psychologist at Massachusetts General Hospital, "we face a world where lookism is one of the most pervasive but denied prejudices". Referring to several studies, Angela Stalcup writes that "The evidence clearly indicates that not only is there a premium for prettiness in Western culture, there is also a penalty for plainness." When discrimination on the grounds of a person's appearance turns into fear or conveyed aversion, it is referred to as cacophobia. Sometimes cacophobia may be internalized and thus directed inwards rather than towards others.

Studies on newborns have found that human infants as young as 14 hours from birth prefer to look at attractive faces rather than unattractive faces. The preference also extends to non-human animals such as cats. These findings indicate that lookism is an innate product of how the human visual system functions.

Research by Dan Ariely found that American women exhibit a marked preference for dating taller men and that for shorter men to be judged attractive by women, they must earn substantially more money than taller men. Some research has suggested that the "beauty premium" for a job largely depends on whether or not attractiveness could potentially enhance productivity, such as those jobs which require substantial interpersonal interaction, while jobs that do not demand this see minimal or no beauty premium.

Men show a strong preference for physical attractiveness over intelligence when choosing a mate, as shown in a study conducted over data from a speed dating experiment. In a study with 4,573 adult participants it was shown that physical attractiveness is the most valued quality in women, even when considered outside of the context of mate selection.

Research indicates that more attractive individuals are at greater risk of being a victim of crime due to being involved in more social interaction, increasing their risk of exposure. However, greater physical attractiveness can also lead individuals to be at greater risk of sexual abuse, regardless of gender.

Ethics
In the article "Is Lookism Unjust", Louis Tietje and Steven Cresap discuss when discrimination based on looks can legitimately be described as unjust.  Tietje and Cresap quote evidence that suggests there exists "a 7–to–9 percent 'penalty' for being in the lowest 9 percent of looks among all workers and a 5 percent 'premium' for being in the top 33 percent". While accepting that the evidence indicates that such discrimination does occur, the authors argue that it has been pervasive throughout history and that judgments of aesthetics appear to be a biological adaptation (rather than culturally conditioned) to aid reproduction, survival, and social interaction, allowing people to determine viable mates (level of attractiveness being indicative of health) and the status of others as "friend or enemy, threat or opportunity". The authors also argue that if physical attractiveness can improve a company's success, then awarding people for it is justifiable, as the trait is thus relevant to the job and discrimination only occurs when irrelevant traits are used. In addition, the authors question the practicality of both redressing any injustices based on lookism and of determining whether such injustices have in fact occurred. Thus the authors conclude that there can be no clear model of injustice in such discrimination, nor would legislation to address it be practicable – "We do not see how any policy interventions to redress beauty discrimination can be justified."

Nancy Etcoff, author of Survival of the Prettiest, argues that human preference for attractiveness is rooted in evolutionary instinct and that trying to prevent it from influencing people would be "telling them to stop enjoying food or sex or novelty or love" and thus argues that "being beautiful and being prized for it is not a social evil."

Political lookism
Lookism has been an issue in politics for centuries, with a long tradition in the United Kingdom of "mercilessly exaggerat[ing]" the physical flaws of politicians in newspaper cartoons. In the 1960 US Presidential race between John F. Kennedy and Richard Nixon, it was often believed that Kennedy's more conventionally handsome appearance contributed to his winning more approval in their first televised debate, but some researchers have challenged this widespread idea and argued that Kennedy's appearance had little or no influence. More broadly, research in countries such as Germany, Canada, the United States, and the United Kingdom has found that more attractive candidates benefit from their appearance by getting more votes in elections, and by being more often forgiven for scandals. In terms of vote choice, at least, the effect of lookism is not even across all contexts. Rather, it appears to primarily matter in cases where voters have low-information elections where voters may have little other to base their vote on (such as non-partisan elections with little media coverage), first-past-the-post elections where voters chose a single candidate, and in elections that are candidate-centered with a weak party system.

There are several variables that might contribute to the objectification of masculinity and femininity in politics. Scholar Charlotte Hooper argued that "gender intersects with other social divisions such as class, race and sexuality to produce complex hierarchies of (gendered) identities".  Hooper argues that institutional practices, such as military combat in war, have greatly defined what it means to be a man. Furthermore, the symbolic dimension, which includes sports, media, current affairs, etc. has "disseminate[d] a wealth of popular iconography which links Western masculinities to the wider world beyond the borders of the state". This is where the ideology of lookism is firmly entrenched according to Hooper. Similarly, Laura Shepherd suggests that men are required to fit into the "matrix of intelligibility" by acting a certain way, dressing a certain way, and have a mentality that is devoid of emotion or anything effeminate; if they are successful in becoming the ultimate "man's man" then they are virtually untouchable. However, others have suggested that there is only an explicit interest in the analysis of masculinity within this political sphere, it will be impossible to develop a reliable analysis of femininity within this same sphere.

Drawing examples from Madeleine Albright's TED talk in 2010, "On Being a Woman and Diplomat", Albright expressed her frustrations with how her male colleagues and media commentators would pick apart her appearance. Being the first female Secretary of State for the United States, Albright was in the spotlight on the domestic and international stage; everything from her age, weight, hairstyle, and choice of dress were scrutinized; yet ironically, the policy positions she believed to be her most important accomplishments (initiation of the G7, attempts to promote gender equality, etc.) were hardly taken into account. The fact that Albright's general appearance didn't fit into the narrow category of "attractive" made it even more difficult for her to navigate the space between being a woman and a diplomat. Albright is not the only woman in a position of power, or otherwise, that has been discriminated against because of her appearance. An article published in The Washington Post in 2005 labeled Secretary of State Condoleezza Rice as a "dominatrix" when she stepped out in knee-high black-heeled boots during a visit to Wiesbaden Military Base in Germany. Although the article was meant to give credit to Rice for "challeng[ing] expectations and assumptions", some argue that the article gave her a hyper-sexualized image, and further removed the audience from focusing on the purpose of her visit to the military place. Similarly, media commentators have often chosen to report on Hillary Clinton's "man suits" and Julia Gillard's short hairstyle, instead of focusing on these women's professional accomplishments. Sarah Palin, former governor of Alaska and 2008 Republican Vice-Presidential candidate, was the subject of much media attention due to her conventionally attractive appearance, with Palin suggesting that the focus on her appearance ignored her professional and policy accomplishments.

Law

United States
Until the 1970s, lookism in the United States was sometimes codified into law. In many jurisdictions, so-called "ugly laws" barred people from appearing in public if they had diseases or disfigurements that were considered unsightly. Today, the Equal Employment Opportunity Commission considers extreme obesity to be a disability protected by the Americans with Disabilities Act, and a few cities protect against discrimination based on appearance. Otherwise, there is no federal law protecting against discrimination based on physical appearance.

Belgium 
In the Antidiscriminatiewet/Loi anti-discrimination (Anti-Discrimination Law) of May 10, 2007, there is a provision that says that one is not allowed to discriminate people based on their physical or genetical characteristics.

See also

 Attributional ambiguity
 Body privilege
 Colorism
 Egalitarianism
 Fat acceptance movement
 Halo effect
 Human physical appearance
 Implicit bias
 Physical attractiveness stereotype
 Sexual capital
 Sexual field
 Sexual objectification
 Sexual selection
 Social stigma
 Stigma (sociological theory)
 Ugliness
 Ugly law
 Women-are-wonderful effect

Animals 
 Black dog syndrome

Fiction 
 Liking What You See: A Documentary

References

Further reading
 Albright, Madeleine. "On being a woman and a diplomat." TEDWomen Recorded December 2010. TED Talk February 2011. Web.
 Enloe, Cynthia. "'Gender' is not enough: the need for a feminist consciousness." International Affairs.: 97.
 Givhan, Robin. "Condoleezza Rice's Commanding Clothes." The Washington Post, sec. Fashion and Beauty, February 25, 2005. (accessed September 23, 2013).
 Hooper, Charlotte. "Masculinities, IR and the 'gender variable': a cost-benefit analysis for (sympathetic) gender skeptics." Review of International Studies. (1999): 475–480.
 Shepherd, Laura J. Sex or Gender? Bodies in World Politics and Why Gender Matters. New York: Routledge, 2010.

External links

 abcnews.go.com – "The Ugly Truth About Beauty" – article on lookism

Human appearance
Prejudice and discrimination by type
Ugliness
Human sexuality
Political terminology
Linguistic controversies
Postmodern theory
Sexual attraction
1970s neologisms